Gad was, according to the Book of Genesis, the first of the two sons of Jacob and Zilpah (Jacob's seventh son) and the founder of the Israelite tribe of Gad. However, some Biblical scholars view this as postdiction, an eponymous metaphor providing an aetiology of the connectedness of the tribe to others in the Israelite confederation. The text of the Book of Genesis implies that the name of Gad means luck/fortunate, in Hebrew.

Biblical narrative and criticism
The Biblical account shows Zilpah's status as a handmaid change to that of an actual wife of Jacob (Genesis 30:9,11). Her handmaid status is regarded by some biblical scholars as indicating that the authors saw the tribe of Gad as being not of entirely Israelite origin; many scholars believe that Gad was a late addition to the Israelite confederation, as implied by the Moabite Stone, which seemingly differentiates between the Israelites and the tribe of Gad. Gad by this theory is assumed to have originally been a northwards-migrating nomadic tribe, at a time when the other tribes were quite settled in Canaan.

Rabbinical sources
According to classical rabbinical literature, Gad was born on 10 Marcheshvan, and lived 125 years. These sources go on to state that, unlike his other brothers, Joseph didn't present Gad to the Pharaoh, since Joseph didn't want Gad to become one of Pharaoh's guards, an appointment that would have been likely had the Pharaoh realised that Gad had great strength.

Book of Jasher
The Book of Jasher states that Gad married Uzith. Uzith was the daughter of Amuram, the granddaughter of Uz and the great-grandson of Nahor (son of Terah).

Tomb
The Prophet Jadur Shrine in Al-Salt, Jordan contains the tomb of Gad, known by Arabs and Muslims as Jadur. It has an elevation of 866 metres and is located in a cemetery.

See also
Tribe of Gad
Gad (deity), pan-Semitic god of fortune
Testament of Gad, apocryphal work

References

External links

Founders of biblical tribes
Children of Jacob